Andrés Martín García (born 11 July 1999) is a Spanish professional footballer who plays as a forward for Rayo Vallecano.

Club career
Born in Aguadulce, Seville, Andalusia, Martín joined Córdoba CF's youth setup in 2016, from Antequera CF. He made his senior debut with the reserves on 20 August 2017, playing the last six minutes in a 2–1 Segunda División B away loss against Extremadura UD.

Martín scored his first senior goal on 1 November 2017, netting the equalizer in a 1–1 home draw against Real Balompédica Linense. The following 21 June, after featuring regularly for the B-team during the campaign, he extended his contract with the club, and featured with the main squad during the whole pre-season.

Martín made his professional debut on 9 September 2018, coming on as a second-half substitute for Alejandro Alfaro in a 0–0 home draw against AD Alcorcón in the Segunda División championship. Three days later he scored his first professional goal, netting the opener in a 2–0 home win against Gimnàstic de Tarragona, in the season's Copa del Rey.

On 26 June 2019, after suffering relegation, Martín signed a five-year contract with Rayo Vallecano, now also in the second division. He helped the Madrid side to achieve promotion to La Liga in the 2020–21 season, scoring four times.

Martín made his top tier debut on 15 August 2021, replacing Óscar Valentín in a 0–3 away loss against Sevilla FC. The following 27 January, after featuring rarely, he was loaned to CD Tenerife in division two, until June.

Career statistics

Club

References

External links

1999 births
Living people
People from Sierra Sur (Seville)
Sportspeople from the Province of Seville
Spanish footballers
Footballers from Andalusia
Association football forwards
La Liga players
Segunda División players
Segunda División B players
Tercera División players
Córdoba CF B players
Córdoba CF players
Rayo Vallecano players
CD Tenerife players
Spain under-21 international footballers